Thüringenhausen is a village and a former municipality in the district Kyffhäuserkreis, in Thuringia, Germany. Since December 2019, it is part of the town Ebeleben.

References

Former municipalities in Thuringia
Kyffhäuserkreis